Ralph Domenick Pratt (born July 7, 1940) is a former member of the Pennsylvania House of Representatives. Pratt was born in 1940 in New Castle. He was later judge of the Pennsylvania Courts of Common Pleas.

References

External links

1940 births
Living people
Judges of the Pennsylvania Courts of Common Pleas
Democratic Party members of the Pennsylvania House of Representatives
People from Lawrence County, Pennsylvania